Drummurry (or Drummuray) is a townland in Magheracross civil parish, County Fermanagh, Northern Ireland.

The topography is undulating and slightly marshy. Land use is predominantly agricultural but includes newer urban development on the outskirts of Ballinamallard township.

Drumcreen

References

Villages in County Fermanagh
Townlands of County Fermanagh